Charlotte Selver (April 4, 1901 in Ruhrort (Duisburg), Germany – August 22, 2003 in Muir Beach, California; née Wittgenstein) was a German music educator.

The central point of Charlotte Selver's work was "experience through the senses". Charlotte Selver was convinced that the well-being of the individual, the society as a whole and even the worries about our environment depend on how far we find new confidence in organic processes.

With her work, "Sensory Awareness", Charlotte Selver had a deciding influence on the "Human Potential Movement", which also came out of the Esalen Institute, where she taught as of 1963. Because of that, she also had influence on Humanistic Psychology and the therapies based on it. Aspects of her work, especially the conscious sensing of the body and the following of physical sensations (Sensory Awareness), flowed into many of the methods of physical work, physical therapy, physical psychotherapy and psychotherapy which still exist today.

Biography 
In the 1920s, Charlotte Selver encountered Elsa Gindler in Berlin, who together with the students in her courses, researched how the natural gifts of people could be developed, even at an adult age. Up until she emigrated to New York in 1938, she studied with Elsa Gindler and the music teacher, Heinrich Jacoby, and she reestablished contact with them in the 1950s.

In 1971, the "Sensory Awareness Foundation" was brought into being. Its goal is to preserve and document Charlotte Selver's life work. In 1995, the "California Institute of Integral Studies" in San Francisco awarded her an honorary doctorate.

Charlotte Selver died on August 22, 2003, at her home in Muir Beach, California, among her closest friends and students at the age of 102.

Sensory Awareness 
Sensory Awareness has its origin in the work of the gymnastics and exercise teacher, Elsa Gindler (1885–1961), and the Swiss music teacher, Heinrich Jacoby (1889–1964). They never gave their 'work' a formal name. The fundamental objective of the Jacoby/Gindler approach is the development of the person (integral unfolding as development and growth to meaningful being). Charlotte Selver was Gindler's student in Berlin before she emigrated to the United States in 1938 and she introduced this work under the name of Sensory Awareness.

Influences on dance therapy and psychotherapy 
Charlotte Selver touched and encouraged thousands of people in the USA, Mexico and Europe in her 80 years of work, among them influential personalities, such as: 
 Psychoanalyst Erich Fromm
 Zen philosopher Alan Watts and his teacher Daisetz Teitaro Suzuki
 Fritz Perls, the founder of Gestalt therapy
 Ida Rolf, the founder of Rolfing
 Moshe Feldenkrais 
 Peter Levine, founder of Somatic experiencing
 Ron Kurtz, founder of Hakomi therapy
 Somatics teachers and practitioners including Don Hanlon Johnson, Judyth Weaver, Pat Odgen, Susan Aposhyan, Christine Cadwell, Edward Maupin and others who taught at the Esalen Institute, including teachers of Esalen Massage

Literature 

 Brooks, Charles: "Erleben durch die Sinne". DtV, Munich 1991, . (Charles Brooks describes courses of his wife and colleague, Charlotte Selver. 230 pages with photographs, original English title: Sensory Awareness.)
  William C. Littlewood, Mary Alice Roche:  Waking Up: The Work of Charlotte Selver. Author House, Bloomington 2004,  
 Charlotte Selver: Every moment is a moment In: Deutsches Yoga-Forum, 3/2005
 Sensory Awareness - zur Arbeitsweise von Charlotte Selver In: Feldenkrais Forum, 4/2005

External links 
 Sensory Awareness Foundation
 Jacoby/Gindler work. Sensory Awareness in German
 Return to Our Senses Website - About Charlotte Selver

Sources 

 "Neugier genügt - Starke Frauen" – WDR broadcast, Friday, October 14, 2005 (11:30 - 11:50, WDR 5) in German

1901 births
2003 deaths
People from Duisburg
People from Muir Beach, California
Somatics
German emigrants to the United States